Outside cylinder can mean:

 One of the dimensions of a gearwheel, see List of gear nomenclature#Outside cylinder 
 A steam locomotive cylinder positioned outside the frame, see Cylinder (locomotive)#Inside or outside cylinders